The Oklahoma City Stars were a minor league professional ice hockey team in the Central Hockey League from 1978 to 1982. They were affiliated with the Minnesota North Stars of the National Hockey League.

The team was run by head coach/general manager Ted Hampson, except for their final season when Tom McVie was the coach. The team made it to the league playoffs in their final two years, but lost both in the first round.

Seasons

Head coaches

References

Defunct Central Hockey League teams
Ice hockey clubs established in 1978
Ice hockey clubs disestablished in 1982
Defunct ice hockey teams in the United States
Central Professional Hockey League teams
1978 establishments in Oklahoma
1982 disestablishments in Oklahoma
Sports in Oklahoma City
Ice hockey teams in Oklahoma
Minnesota North Stars minor league affiliates
Calgary Flames minor league affiliates